Vamsy is an Indian film director, screenwriter and music director known for his works in Telugu cinema. In 1985, he received the National Film Award for Sitaara. Vamsy has his own style of making the movie with art like the director Bapu.

Early life 

Vamsy was born in Balabhadrapuram,and brought up in the village of Pasalapudi, near Ramachandrapuram of East Godavari District, Andhra Pradesh.

Career 

Vamsy started writing stories at the age of 15. His first story is "Satya Sundari Navvindi" was read in All India Radio in 1975. He has also written 2 novels, "Manchu Pallaki" & "Karma Sakshi" which were published in "Andhra Jyothy Weekly" before beginning his film career.

In 1976, he started to explore his career in Madras, beginning his work with V. Madhusudhana Rao as assistant director for many films, later worked as an assistant director to K. Viswanath on Sankarabharanam, Bharathiraja on Seethakoka Chilaka before making his first film Manchupallaki with Chiranjeevi, Suhasini, Tripuraneni Sai Chand and Rajendra Prasad in 1982. The movie was a remake of the Tamil film Palaivana Solai directed by Robert–Rajasekar. In 1984, Vamsy made the critically acclaimed Sitaara, with which he introduced Bhanupriya to the Telugu film industry. The movie was adapted from his own novel Mahal lo Kokila (The Nightingale in the Palace). The movie won the National Film Award for Best Feature Film in Telugu. In 1985, he made 'Preminchu Pelladu', the first movie with Rajendra Prasad as the sole lead.

For a significant period of his career, Vamsy collaborated with the music director Ilayaraja, and their duo had produced best music in Telugu till date. Some of their best work has been in co-operation with each other. The two were so attuned to each other's way of thinking that for a song in his movie Ladies Tailor, Vamsy shot the song picturization ("Ekkada Ekkada") before the song was recorded by music director. This is against the norm as usually the songs are recorded first and the filming made later in most movies.

Vamsy is also closely associated with Bapu and had most of Bapu's lifetime work done for Vamsy with over 400 arts for his stories and Bapu also designed all Vamsy's film titles. Vamsy directed a documentary "Bommarshi Bapu" and won a Nandi Award for Best Director from the State Government of Andhra Pradesh in 1996.

Vamsy has introduced many actors and technicians to the film industry like Rajendra Prasad, Tanikella Bharani, Bhanupriya, Mallikarjuna Rao, Maharshi Raghava, Kondavalasa, Pradeep Shakthi, Krishna Bhagavaan, Shantipriya, Hamsa Nandini, ...and many others., Introduced villain role Jeeva as comedian.

He has published a short stories compilation called Maa Pasalapudi Kathalu. Besides that compilation, Vamsy has written a wide variety of short stories since 1974 when he was 16 years old. His major works include Mahallo kokila, Manchupallaki, Aa Naati Vaana Chinukulu, Venditera Kathalu (original scripts of Sankarabharanam and Anveshana), Vennela Bomma, Gokulam lo Radha, Ravvala konda, Sree seetarama lanchi service Rajahmundry, Manyam rani, Rangularatnam. He has penned around 360 short stories published in Swathi (magazine) weekly under the title "Maa Diguwa Godavari Kathalu" For his contributions to the art of storytelling with a native approach through his books he was bestowed with "Sripada Puraskhaaram" at Rajamundry on 17 April 2011.

He also directed a TV serial named Lady Detective for ETV (Telugu) which was aired every Thursday in 1995–96.

Style 

Vamsy is one of the very few filmmakers in Telugu who tries to depict the nativity of the concerned story. Although he is well known for portraying the scenic beauty of the Godavari and surrounding regions, the element of characterization is the highlight in his films. Ilaiyaraja has a special affection for Vamsy to the extent he once gave him 100 tunes to pick from for a particular movie. He used to take Vamsy to several special spots in Tamil Nadu including spiritual places, temples, forests, and mountains like Kollimalai and Arunachalam.

He directed Anveshana, in 1985, a murder mystery thriller set in the Talakona forest, near Tirupati. Vamsy mentioned that he got inspiration from the 1971 European film, The Cat o' Nine Tails, for the story. Ilaiyaraaja scored brilliant background music to evoke the spooky forest atmosphere and horror surrounding the murders. The film still stands as an unmatched classic thriller in Telugu cinema, with a Hitchcockian climax. Vamsi mentioned that Ram Gopal Varma became so obsessed with the film, that he watched it 22 times, during his college days.

Filmography

Director

Assistant Director

Lyricist

Singer

Writer

Music director

References

External links
 Vamsy Fansite
 Series on Vamsy
 
 MBS Prasad's articles on Pasalapudy kathalu

Living people
Telugu film directors
20th-century Indian film directors
1956 births
21st-century Indian film directors
Film directors from Andhra Pradesh
People from East Godavari district
Telugu screenwriters
Screenwriters from Andhra Pradesh